Robert Shanks was an English professional footballer who played as a full-back in the Football League for Exeter City and Stockport County, in non-League football for Stockton, York City and Connah's Quay & Shotton, and was on the books of Huddersfield Town without making a league appearance.

References

Year of birth missing
People from the Borough of Stockton-on-Tees
Footballers from County Durham
Year of death missing
English footballers
Association football fullbacks
Stockton F.C. players
York City F.C. players
Huddersfield Town A.F.C. players
Connah's Quay & Shotton F.C. players
Exeter City F.C. players
Stockport County F.C. players
Midland Football League players
English Football League players